Edward 'Ed' Jancarz (20 August 1946 – 11 January 1992) was a Polish international speedway rider.

Career
Jancarz rode in the UK for the Wimbledon Dons between 1977–1982 winning the Internationale at Wimbledon in his first season, and in Poland for Stal Gorzów. He participated in ten Speedway World Championship finals, his highest placing being in his first final when he finished on the rostrum in third place after a run-off with Russian rider Gennady Kurilenko. He was also a member of the Polish World Team Cup winning team of 1969. He won the prestigious Embassy Internationale, at Wimbledon in 1977. After his riding career ended he was a speedway coach. He was trainer in Stal Gorzów, KKŻ Krosno and Polish national team.

Death

On 11 January 1992 he was fatally stabbed by his second wife, Katarzyna, during a domestic dispute caused by his alcoholism he had suffered from since the mid-1980s. Since his death the Edward Jancarz Memorial has been a semi-annual meeting at the speedway that carries his name, the Edward Jancarz Stadium in Gorzów Wielkopolski. To date, 2010 World Champion Tomasz Gollob is the only Polish rider to win the memorial, having done so in 1998 and 1999

Edward Jancarz was the first speedway rider in the World to have a monument dedicated to them. The Monument of Edward Jancarz was built in 2005 and is in the city centre of Gorzów Wielkopolski.

World Final Appearances

Individual World Championship
 1968 -  Gothenburg, Ullevi - 3rd - 11pts + 3pts
 1969 -  London, Wembley Stadium - 6th - 9pts
 1973 -  Chorzów, Silesian Stadium - 11th - 6pts
 1974 -  Gothenburg, Ullevi - Reserve - 1pt
 1975 -  London, Wembley Stadium - 12th - 4pts
 1976 -  Chorzów, Silesian Stadium - 12th - 5pts
 1977 -  Gothenburg, Ullevi - 13th - 4pts
 1979 -  Chorzów, Silesian Stadium - 9th - 7pts
 1981 -  London, Wembley Stadium - 12th - 5pts
 1982 -  Los Angeles, Memorial Coliseum - 10th - 7pts

World Pairs Championship
 1974 -  Manchester, Hyde Road (with Zenon Plech) - 5th - 18pts (6)
 1975 -  Wrocław, Olympic Stadium (with Piotr Bruzda) - 2nd - 23pts (15)
 1976 -  Eskilstuna, Eskilstuna Motorstadion (with Zenon Plech) - 7th - 10pts (7)
 1978 -  Chorzów, Silesian Stadium (with Bolesław Proch) - 5th - 15pts (13)
 1979 -  Vojens, Speedway Center (with Zenon Plech) - 3rd - 20pts (13)
 1980 -  Krsko, Matija Gubec Stadium (with Zenon Plech) - 2nd - 22pts (15)
 1981 -  Chorzów, Silesian Stadium (with Zenon Plech) - 3rd - 21pts (6)

World Team Cup
 1968 -  London, Wembley Stadium (with Edmund Migoś / Paweł Waloszek / Andrzej Wyglenda / Henryk Glücklich) - 3rd - 19pts (6)
 1969 -  Rybnik, Rybnik Municipal Stadium (with Andrzej Wyglenda / Stanisław Tkocz / Henryk Glucklich / Andrzej Pogorzelski) - Winner - 31pts (11)
 1971 -  Wroclaw, Olympic Stadium (with Paweł Waloszek / Henryk Glücklich / Antoni Woryna / Andrzej Wyglenda) - 3rd - 19pts (4)
 1973 -  London, Wembley Stadium (with Paweł Waloszek / Zenon Plech / Jerzy Szczakiel) - 4th - 8pts (2)
 1975 -  Norden, Motodrom Halbemond (with Henryk Glucklich / Zenon Plech / Marek Cieślak / Jerzy Rembas) - 4th - 9pts (1)
 1976 -  London, White City Stadium (with Zenon Plech / Marek Cieślak / Jerzy Rembas  / Bolesław Proch) - 2nd - 28pts (9)
 1977 -  Wrocław, Olympic Stadium (with Jerzy Rembas / Bogusław Nowak / Marek Cieślak  / Ryszard Fabiszewski) - 2nd - 25pts (10)
 1978 -  Landshut, Ellermühle Stadium (with Zenon Plech / Marek Cieślak / Jerzy Rembas / Andrzej Huszcza) - 3rd - 16+3pts (6+3)
 1980 -  Wrocław, Olympic Stadium (with Zenon Plech / Roman Jankowski / Andrzej Huszcza / Jerzy Rembas) - 3rd - 15pt (3)

See also
 Edward Jancarz Memorial
 Poland national speedway team

References

1946 births
1992 deaths
Male murder victims
Mariticides
Polish speedway champions
Polish speedway riders
Sportspeople from Gorzów Wielkopolski
Wimbledon Dons riders
Polish murder victims
Deaths by stabbing in Poland
People murdered in Poland